Swiss Cottage Secondary School (SCSS) is a co-educational government secondary school in Bukit Batok, Singapore. Founded in 1963, it offers secondary education leading to the Singapore-Cambridge GCE Ordinary Level or Singapore-Cambridge GCE Normal Level examinations.

History

Founding
SCSS started in 1962 with about 200 pupils, housed at Raffles Institution at Bras Basah Road as the school building along Dunearn Road was still under construction. In July 1963, students and staff moved into a new school premises at Swiss Cottage Estate (along Dunearn Road), which officially opened in November 1963, with an enrolment of about 870 pupils in two mediums, namely English and Malay. In 1966, Minister for Law and National Development Edmund W. Barker described SCSS as one of the foremost integrated schools in Singapore.

Relocation 
In 1991, SCSS relocated from Dunearn Road to its current Bukit Batok campus. In 1997, SCSS was ranked 19 among all secondary schools in Singapore.

Identity and culture

School crest 
The crest is headed by five stars, which symbolise equality, peace, progress, justice and democracy. These are ideals on which a brotherhood of persons can be built. Below, there is a torch which signifies the light of knowledge and the love of learning. Encompassing it are the five rings symbolising sports and the part they play to link persons together. The five horizontal bands denote the five houses as rivals in competition but steadfast in fraternity.

Uniform 
SCSS's uniform consists of a white collard shirt with an embroidered crest and long white trousers for all male students, and a white blouse with an embroidered crest and turquoise-blue four-pleated skirt for female students.

For official functions, students representing the school would wear a turquoise blazer, with a white long-sleeved shirt with long white trousers for males, and a long-sleeved blouse with a pleated white skirt for females. A turquoise tie is worn and formal dress shoes are worn for males, and court shoes for females.

Academic information 
Swiss Cottage Secondary offers three academics streams, the four-year Express Stream, Normal (Academic) Stream, and the Normal (Technical) Stream. The Express stream leads to the Singapore-Cambridge GCE Ordinary Level examinations, while the Normal (Academic & Technical) streams leads to the Singapore-Cambridge GCE Normal Level examinations.

Subject offered

Distinctive Programmes

Thoughtful Leadership Programme 
SCSS became one of the six Community Youth Leadership (CYL) schools in Singapore in 2014. To effect the CYL function well, we developed the distinctive Thoughtful Leadership Programme (TLP). The TLP is also the Learning for Life (LLP) curriculum that propels the Thoughtful Leadership focus. It is one of the two Distinctive Programmes (the second being the Applied Sciences for Sustainable Development Programme) of the school.

Applied Learning Programme: Applied Sciences For Sustainable Development Programme 
The Applied Sciences programme was developed and launched in 2014 to educate our youths about sustainable development. The programme provides a platform for students to develop knowledge and confidence about their potential roles in helping to ensure our future.

Enhanced Citizenship Programme 
Started in 2014, the Enhanced Citizenship Programme complements the school's Humanities Programme and enlivens the outcomes of Character and Citizenship Education by tapping on multiple platforms. The study of Conservation that the programme puts a sharp focus on helps students to navigate the balance between rootedness and openness in an age of globalization and modernity.

Full Subject-Based Banding 
SCSS is one of the 28 secondary schools selected by the Ministry of Education to start piloting aspects of Full Subject-Based Banding (SBB) from 2020 onwards. With Full SBB, the school is moving towards one secondary education, with many subject bands, to better meet students’ learning needs, without labels. This is part of the broader shift in the education system to recognise the strengths and interests of students, to help them build their confidence and develop an intrinsic motivation to learn for life in them.

Admissions 
Students are enrolled through the Direct School Admission (DSA) or the Joint Admissions Exercise (JAE). SCSS's cut-off point for the Express Stream has consistently been within the 235-240 range, making it one of the top 40 secondary schools in Singapore. SCSS does not have affiliations with other schools or institutions.

Co-curricular activities 
SCSS offers 19 co-curricular activities (CCAs). These CCAs include uniformed groups, sports, performing arts, and clubs and societies.

The school is notable for its military band, the Singapore National Cadet Corps (NCC) Command Band “Swiss Winds”. The Command Band primarily provides musical support in HQ NCC's military functions, in addition to other uniformed services. In the local band scene, the Command Band has consistently achieved Distinction in the Singapore Youth Festival, and has been a part of the National Day Parade’s Parade and Ceremony Combined Band since 2010.

The school is also well-known for its floorball team which has achieved National 1st Runner Up in Schools Championship 'C' Division Girls in 2018. And, more recently, its achievements in obtaining Gold in the National School Games 'B' and 'C' Division Girls in 2022.

The school's Uniformed Groups are also particularly notable, with the National Cadet Corps (Air) achieving Gold in the Best Unit Competition in 2017, Girl Guides achieving the Puan Noor Aishah Gold Award, Scouts achieving the Frank Coopers Sand Gold Award in 2017, and St. John's Brigade achieving Corps Achievement Gold Award.

References

External links
 Official website

Secondary schools in Singapore
Bukit Batok
Educational institutions established in 1962